This is a list of films produced in Turkmenistan. For a discussion on the cinema of Turkmenistan, see Cinema of Turkmenistan.

A  
Akpamyk (1996) 
Angelochek sdelay radost (1993)

D  
Destan moey yunosti (1992)

H  
Ham hyyal (1996)

K  
Karakum (1994)

M
Mankurt (1990)

N  
Neschastnaya indyanka (1992)
Nevestka (1972)
Nejep oglan (2019)

O  
Okhlamon (1993)

P  
The Piano Tuner (2001)
Prikluchenia Aldar-Kose (1970)

T
Tree Dzhamal (1981)

Y  
Yandym (1995)

References

External links
 Turkmenistani film at the Internet Movie Database

Turkmenistan

Films